Morichini is an Italian surname. Notable people with the surname include:

 Domenico Morichini (1773–1836), Italian physician and scientist
 Carlo Luigi Morichini (1805–1879), Italian Cardinal

Italian-language surnames